Thomas C. Ripley (January 2, 1807 – February 12, 1897) was a United States representative from New York.

Biography
Thomas Cornell Ripley was born in Broadalbin, New York on January 2, 1807.  (Some sources indicate Easton, New York.)  He graduated from Rensselaer Polytechnic Institute in 1828, Studied law, was admitted to the bar, and practised in Little Falls.  He subsequently relocated to Schaghticoke.

Ripley was elected as a Whig to the 29th United States Congress, filling the vacancy caused by the death of Richard P. Herrick. He served from December 1846 to March 1847, and was not a candidate for a full term in 1846.

In 1854, he moved to Saginaw, Michigan, where he farmed and continued to practice law.  He joined the Republican Party at its founding and held several local offices, including School Superintendent.  He served in the Michigan House of Representatives from 1873 to 1874.

Ripley died in Saginaw on February 12, 1897.  He was interred in Saginaw's Oakwood Cemetery.

References

External links

1807 births
1897 deaths
Rensselaer Polytechnic Institute alumni
People from Broadalbin, New York
People from Schaghticoke, New York
Politicians from Saginaw, Michigan
New York (state) lawyers
Michigan lawyers
Republican Party members of the Michigan House of Representatives
Burials in Michigan
Cornell family
Whig Party members of the United States House of Representatives from New York (state)
People from Little Falls, New York
People from Easton, New York
19th-century American politicians